Kenronte Walker (born July 28, 1990) is an American football strong safety who is currently a free agent. He was signed as an undrafted free agent by the Cleveland Browns in 2013. He played college football at Missouri.

Professional career

Cleveland Browns
On May 2, 2013, he signed with the Cleveland Browns as an undrafted free agent. On August 18, 2013, he was waived by the Browns. He appeared on the season 7 premiere of Wipeout, "Fall in the Family", with his cousin, Courtney.

Nebraska Danger
On May 19, 2015, Walker was signed by the Nebraska Danger of the Indoor Football League.

References

External links
Missouri Tigers bio
Cleveland Browns bio

1990 births
Living people
Missouri Tigers football players
Cleveland Browns players
Nebraska Danger players
City College of San Francisco Rams football players